Tellow or Talu may refer to:

Talu, Chaharmahal and Bakhtiari
Tellow-e Bala, Tehran Province
Tellow-e Pain, Tehran Province